Michelle De La Isla (born March 19, 1976) is an American politician who served as the mayor of Topeka, Kansas from 2018 to 2022. She previously served on the Topeka City Council from 2013 to 2018. De La Isla was the city's first Latina and single mother to serve as mayor. She was the Democratic nominee for Kansas's 2nd congressional district in the 2020 election, but lost.

Early life and education
Born in New York City, De La Isla grew up mostly in Puerto Rico. She attended the University of Puerto Rico at Mayagüez before moving to Wichita, Kansas in 2000. She experienced homelessness and gave birth to a child as a teenager. In 2001, she graduated from Wichita State University with a bachelor of science degree in biology. She received an MBA in leadership and human resources from Fort Hays State University and is in the MPA program for mid-career professionals at Harvard University.

Career 
De La Isla worked as a teacher for Upward Bound. In 2005, she moved to Topeka, Kansas, and joined Housing and Credit Counseling, Inc. as its Community Relations and Spanish Services Coordinator, and later, its Chief Financial Officer.

Politics
In 2013, De La Isla ran for Topeka City Council and was elected to represent the fifth district. She served as deputy mayor to mayor Larry Wolgast in 2016. De La Isla announced her candidacy for mayor on April 11, 2017 after Wolgast announced he would not seek reelection.

On November 7, 2017, De La Isla won the Topeka mayoral race by a margin of 501 votes. Before the election, De La Isla also announced that she would continue her employment at Evergy, which also makes her the first mayor to hold additional employment during her tenure.

As mayor, De La Isla serves on the Washburn University Board of Regents, the Board of the Joint Economic Development Organization, and as Tri-Chair of GO Topeka’s Momentum 2022 collective action plan for Topeka and Shawnee County.

On January 6, 2020, De La Isla announced she was running as a Democrat to represent Kansas's 2nd congressional district. On August 4, De La Isla won the Democratic primary to advance to the November 3, 2020 general election. She was defeated by Kansas Treasurer Jake LaTurner in the November general election.

On March 19, 2021, De La Isla announced that she will not run for another term as mayor.

Personal life 
De La Isla has two daughters and one son.

References

External links
Mayor De La Isla government website
Michelle for Kansas campaign website

 

1976 births
21st-century American politicians
21st-century American women politicians
Evergy
Hispanic and Latino American mayors
Hispanic and Latino American women in politics
Kansas city council members
Kansas Democrats
Living people
Mayors of Topeka, Kansas
Politicians from New York City
Women mayors of places in Kansas
Wichita State University alumni
Women city councillors in Kansas